Hvanneyri is a small settlement located in western Iceland. The town is an agricultural and church center known for its history of farming. Hvanneyri can be found 80 km north of Reykjavik in the municipality of Borgarbyggð. Hvanneyri is also home to the Agricultural University of Iceland. The town has an estimated population of 250 inhabitants.

References 

Populated places in Western Region (Iceland)